Annualized failure rate (AFR) gives the estimated probability that a device or component will fail during a full year of use. It is a relation between the mean time between failure (MTBF) and the hours that a number of devices are run per year.  AFR is estimated from a sample of like components—AFR and MTBF as given by vendors are population statistics that can not predict the behaviour of an individual unit.

Hard disk drives
For example, AFR is used to characterize the reliability of hard disk drives.

The relationship between AFR and MTBF (in hours) is:

This equation assumes that the device or component is powered on for the full 8766 hours of a year, and gives the estimated fraction of an original sample of devices or components that will fail in one year, or, equivalently, 1 − AFR is the fraction of devices or components that will show no failures over a year. It is based on an exponential failure distribution (see failure rate for a full derivation).
Note: Some manufacturers count a year as 8760 hours.

This ratio can be approximated by, assuming a small AFR,

For example, a common specification for PATA and SATA drives may be an MTBF of 300,000 hours, giving an approximate theoretical 2.92% annualized failure rate i.e. a 2.92% chance that a given drive will fail during a year of use.

The AFR for a drive is derived from time-to-fail data from a reliability-demonstration test (RDT).

AFR will increase towards and beyond the end of the service life of a device or component.  Google's 2007 study found, based on a large field sample of drives, that actual AFRs for individual drives ranged from 1.7% for first year drives to over 8.6% for three-year-old drives. A CMU 2007 study showed an estimated 3% mean AFR over 1–5 years based on replacement logs for a large sample of drives.

See also
 Failure rate
 Frequency of exceedance

References 

Engineering failures
Rates